Leighton Bennett (born 31 December 2005 in Lincoln, England) is an English professional darts player who plays in Professional Darts Corporation events. He won the final of the 2019 BDO World Youth Darts Championship.

Career

BDO
In August 2018, Bennett won the Cambridgeshire Open, aged 12; in the semi-final, he beat Ricky Evans, before seeing off Rhys Hayden in the final. In October 2018, he booked his place in the final of the 2019 BDO World Youth Darts Championship. He beat Nathan Girvan 3–0 in the Final to become 2019 BDO World Youth Champion. In 2019, Bennett started competing on the men's BDO tour. He reached the Final of the Luxembourg Open and was also a Semi-finalist in the Welsh Open, French Open, German Open, Antwerp Open and Polish Open. Bennett qualified for the 2020 BDO World Darts Championship, becoming the youngest player ever to compete in the Men's tournament. He also became the first player to compete in the Men's tournament and Youth final in the same year.

World Championship results

BDO
 2020: First round (lost to Scott Mitchell 1–3) (sets)

BDO (Youth)
 2019: Winner (beat Nathan Girvan 3–0) (sets)
 2020: Runner-up (lost to Keane Barry 0–3)

WDF (Boys)
 2022: Semi-finals (lost to Charlie Large 1–2)

References

External links
 WDF Boys Rankings
 Profile and stats on Darts Database

Living people
English darts players
British Darts Organisation players
Professional Darts Corporation associate players
2005 births
People from Lincoln, England